The Adventures of Hajji Baba is a 1954 American CinemaScope adventure film directed by Don Weis and starring John Derek and Elaine Stewart. Made in Southern California, it was released on October 1, 1954. In the credits it states that the film is suggested by The Adventures of Hajji Baba of Ispahan by James Justinian Morier (3 vols., London, 1824).

Plot
In Ispahan, Persia, a barber named Hajji Baba (John Derek) is leaving his father's shop to find a great fortune. At the same time, the Princess Fawzia (Elaine Stewart) is trying to talk her father into giving her in marriage to Nur-El-Din (Paul Picerni) a prince known far and wide. Her father intends for Fawzia to marry a friend and ally, and makes plans to send her to him. But a courier brings word from Nur-El-Din that an escort awaits Fawzia on the outskirts of the city and she escapes the palace disguised as a boy. Hajji encounters the escort-warrior at the rendez-vous spot, is attacked and beats up the escort with his barber's tools. The princess arrives and mistakes Hajji as the escort until he mistakes the emerald ring sent by Nur-El-Din to Fawzia as the prize to be delivered. In her efforts to escape him, her turban becomes unbound and Hajji realizes that the girl herself is the treasure Nur-El-Din awaits. Hajji promises to escort her and they spend the night with the caravan of Osman Aga (Thomas Gomez), who invites them to stay for the dancing girls, among them, the incomparable Ayesha (Rosemarie Bowe). The pair are overtaken by the Caliph's (Donald Randolph) guards sent to bring Fawzia back, but the guards are driven off by an invading army of Turcoman women, a band of fierce and beautiful women who prey on passing merchants.

Cast 
 John Derek as Hajji Baba
 Elaine Stewart as Princess Fawzia
 Rosemarie Bowe as Ayesha
 Amanda Blake as Banah, The Turkamen Leader
 Paul Picerni as Nur-El-Din
 Donald Randolph as The Caliph
 Thomas Gomez as Osman Aga
 Pat Sheehan as Handmaiden
 Madelyn Darrow as Handmaiden (credited as Madeline Witlinger)
 Beverly Thompson as Handmaiden
 Marilyn Dean as Handmaiden
 Joanne Arnold as Susu
 Pat Lawler as Slave Girl
 Laurette Luez as Meriam

Production
The film is based on The Adventures of Hajji Baba of Ispahan by James Justinian Morier published in 1824.  It was popular and remained in print for over a century.

In the early 1950s Walter Wanger produced four films with Allied Artists. They were happy with the results and signed a new contract with the producer, the first of which was to be Hajji Baba. It was a return to the type of film Wagner had previously made such as Arabian Nights (1942).

Allied Artists had been shut down for three months but re-opened again with a slate of ten films starting with Hajji Baba. Elaine Stewart and Don Weis were borrowed from MGM. Filming started 12 April 1954. Linda Christian was meant to play a role but dropped out and was replaced by Amanda Blake.

With the creation of CinemaScope, 20th Century Fox wooed film producers by agreeing to license their wide screen scope lenses to various non-Fox studios.  The Adventures of Hajji Baba was the first of three CinemaScope films made by Allied Artists Pictures.  In addition to supplying the widescreen camera lenses, Fox agreed to finance 50% of the films with Allied Artists receiving the domestic gross of the film and Fox receiving the overseas grosses of the film.

Reception
The film was a hit and made a profit of $673,593.

Availability
The film is occasionally shown on Turner Classic Movies and FXM. It had a small release on VHS.

It is available on Blu-ray from Twilight Time.

Soundtrack
 Hajji Baba (Persian Lament)
 Sung by Nat 'King' Cole
 Music by Dimitri Tiomkin
 Lyrics by Ned Washington
 Arranged by Nelson Riddle

References

External links 
 
 
 
 

1954 films
1954 adventure films
20th Century Fox films
CinemaScope films
Films scored by Dimitri Tiomkin
Films based on British novels
Films directed by Don Weis
Films shot in Lone Pine, California
Films set in Iran
Films set in the 18th century
Films produced by Walter Wanger
American adventure films
1950s English-language films
1950s American films